Štefanje is a municipality in Bjelovar-Bilogora County, Croatia. There are 2,030 inhabitants. In the 2011 census, 92% of the population were Croats.

The list of settlements in the municipality is:
 Blatnica, population 130
 Daskatica, population 122
 Donja Šušnjara, population 131
 Gornja Šušnjara, population 28
 Laminac, population 341
 Narta, population 677
 Starine, population 79
 Staro Štefanje, population 186
 Štefanje, population 336

References

Municipalities of Croatia
Populated places in Bjelovar-Bilogora County